Peter Laing (born 5 October 1984) is a South African cricketer. He played in 17 first-class and 16 List A matches for Boland and Western Province from 2005 to 2010.

References

External links
 

1984 births
Living people
South African cricketers
Boland cricketers
Western Province cricketers
Cricketers from Johannesburg